The 2010 Guangxi Wildfire occurred in western Guangxi, China during that year's spring season.

Background
On Thursday, March 3, 2010, a wildfire ignited in the mountainous county of Longlin in Guangxi, China. Drought had already begun to impact the area previously, and the dry weather and lack of water contributed to the fire's success. The wildfire burned large volumes of forests and brush until it was finally put out six days and twenty-two hours later.

Effects
According to Longlin County's fire control headquarters, a day after its ignition the fire had already burned 1,400 Mu (or about 93 hectares or 229 acres) of forestland, with a front spanning 5.3 kilometers. The fire was also heading towards the Zhongshan National Nature Reserve, where over two hundred of the endangered black-necked pheasant lived and were at risk of being affected by the traveling flames.

Along with the area's locals, over one hundred firefighters and a Mi-26 helicopter were employed to suppress the fire.

After the fire was suppressed, the drought continued to worsen in the southern China region, especially in Guangxi. Two months after the fire, torrential rain caused flash floods and landslides in the same area.

References

Wildfires in China
2010 disasters in China
2010 wildfires
March 2010 events in China